The 23rd and 24th Streets Historic District is located in La Crosse, Wisconsin. It was added to the National Register of Historic Places in 2010.

History
Contributing buildings in the district were constructed from 1915 to 1952. Most houses were built for middle-class citizens.

References

Houses on the National Register of Historic Places in Wisconsin
Geography of La Crosse County, Wisconsin
Houses in La Crosse County, Wisconsin
National Register of Historic Places in La Crosse County, Wisconsin